The constituency of Queenborough was a rotten borough situated on the Isle of Sheppey in Kent.

From 1572 until it was abolished by the great reform act of 1832, it returned two Members of Parliament. The franchise was vested in the freemen of the town, of whom there were more than 300.  Its electorate was therefore one of largest of the 56 boroughs that were abolished.  Most freemen, however, were non resident.

A small town in Kent, England, which grew as a port near the Thames Estuary. 
Formerly a municipal borough in the Faversham parliamentary division of Kent, is two miles south of Sheerness on the Isle of Sheppey, nearby the westward entrance to the Swale, where it joins the River Medway. It is now in the Sittingbourne and Sheppey parliamentary constituency and governed by Swale Borough Council and Queenborough Town Council.

Members of Parliament

1572-1640

1640-1832

Notes

References
Robert Beatson, A Chronological Register of Both Houses of Parliament (London: Longman, Hurst, Res & Orme, 1807) 
D Brunton & D H Pennington, Members of the Long Parliament (London: George Allen & Unwin, 1954)
Cobbett's Parliamentary history of England, from the Norman Conquest in 1066 to the year 1803 (London: Thomas Hansard, 1808) 
 J E Neale, The Elizabethan House of Commons (London: Jonathan Cape, 1949)
 Henry Stooks Smith, "The Parliaments of England from 1715 to 1847" (2nd edition, edited by FWS Craig - Chichester: Parliamentary Reference Publications, 1973)
 

Parliamentary constituencies in Kent (historic)
Politics of Swale
Constituencies of the Parliament of the United Kingdom established in 1572
Constituencies of the Parliament of the United Kingdom disestablished in 1832
Rotten boroughs